Shirin Daraq (also Romanized as Shīrīn Daraq) is a village in Owch Hacha Rural District, in the Central District of Ahar County, East Azerbaijan Province, Iran. At the 2006 census, its population was 165, in 34 families.

References 

Populated places in Ahar County